Polton railway station served the village of Polton, Midlothian, Scotland from 1867 to 1964 on the Esk Valley Railway.

History 
The station opened on 15 April 1867 by the Esk Valley Railway. It was situated on the east side of Polton Road. The moderately sized goods yard had three sidings, one stabling a locomotive when required due to there being no engine shed. There was also a private siding for Springfield Paper Mill to the west of the station. A second private siding served Polton Mill to the north and a third siding served Kevock Mill on the up side of the line. The station closed to passengers on 10 September 1951 and closed to goods traffic, along with the line, on 18 May 1964.

References

External links 

Disused railway stations in Midlothian
Former North British Railway stations
Railway stations in Great Britain opened in 1867
Railway stations in Great Britain closed in 1951
1867 establishments in Scotland
1964 disestablishments in Scotland
Bonnyrigg and Lasswade